Amir Nasar A Din (born 5 March 1993) is an Israeli-Druze footballer who plays as a defender.

References

Profile at IFA website

1993 births
Israeli footballers
Druze sportspeople
Living people
Maccabi Haifa F.C. players
Bnei Sakhnin F.C. players
Hapoel Nir Ramat HaSharon F.C. players
Maccabi Daliyat al-Karmel F.C. players
Hapoel Kafr Kanna F.C. players
Israeli Premier League players
Liga Leumit players
Israeli Druze
People from Daliyat al-Karmel
Association football defenders